Fiber diffraction is a subarea of scattering, an area in which molecular structure is determined from scattering data (usually of X-rays, electrons or neutrons). In fiber diffraction the scattering pattern does not change, as the sample is rotated about a unique axis (the fiber axis). Such uniaxial symmetry is frequent with filaments or fibers consisting of biological or man-made macromolecules. In crystallography fiber symmetry is an aggravation regarding the determination of crystal structure, because reflexions are smeared and may overlap in the fiber diffraction pattern. Materials science considers fiber symmetry a simplification, because almost the complete obtainable structure information is in a single two-dimensional (2D) diffraction pattern exposed on photographic film or on a 2D detector. 2 instead of 3 co-ordinate directions suffice to describe fiber diffraction.

The ideal fiber pattern exhibits 4-quadrant symmetry. In the ideal pattern the fiber axis is called the meridian, the perpendicular direction is called equator. In case of fiber symmetry, many more reflexions than in single-crystal diffraction show up in the 2D pattern. In fiber patterns these reflexions clearly appear arranged along lines (layer lines) running almost parallel to the equator. Thus, in fiber diffraction the layer line concept of crystallography becomes palpable. Bent layer lines indicate that the pattern must be straightened. Reflexions are labelled by the Miller index hkl, i.e. 3 digits. Reflexions on the i-th layer line share l=i. Reflexions on the meridian are 00l-reflexions. In crystallography artificial fiber diffraction patterns are generated by rotating a single crystal about an axis (rotating crystal method).

Non-ideal fiber patterns are obtained in experiments. They only show mirror symmetry about the meridian. The reason is that the fiber axis and the incident beam (X-rays, electrons, neutrons) cannot be perfectly oriented perpendicular to each other. The corresponding geometric distortion has been extensively studied by Michael Polanyi introducing the concept of Polanyi's sphere (German: "Lagenkugel") intersecting Ewald's sphere. Later Rosalind Franklin and Raymond Gosling have carried out their own geometrical reasoning and presented an approximative equation for the fiber tilt angle β. Analysis starts by mapping the distorted 2D pattern on the representative plane of the fiber. This is the plane that contains the cylinder axis in reciprocal space. In crystallography first an approximation of the mapping into reciprocal space is computed that is refined iteratively. The digital method frequently called Fraser correction starts from the Franklin approximation for the tilt angle β. It eliminates fiber tilt, unwarps the detector image, and corrects the scattering intensity. The correct equation for the determination of β has been presented by Norbert Stribeck.

Historical role
Fibrous materials such as wool or cotton easily form aligned bundles, and were among the first biological macromolecules studied by X-ray diffraction, notably by William Astbury in the early 1930s. Fiber diffraction data led to several important advances in the development of structural biology, e.g., the original models of the α-helix and the Watson-Crick model of double-stranded DNA.

Fiber diffraction geometry

The animation shows the geometry of fiber diffraction. It is based on the notions proposed by Polanyi. Reference direction is the primary beam (label: X-ray). If the fiber is tilted away from the perpendicular direction by an angle β, as well the information about its molecular structure in reciprocal space (trihedron labelled s-space) is tilted. In reciprocal space the Ewald sphere has its center in the sample. Its radius is 1/λ, with λ the wavelength of the incident radiation. On the surface of the Ewald sphere all the points of reciprocal space are found that are seen by the detector. These points are mapped on the pixels of the detector by central projection.

In s-space each reflexion is found on its Polanyi-sphere. Intrinsically the ideal reflexion is a point in s-space, but fiber symmetry turns it into a ring smeared out by rotation about the fiber direction. Two rings represent each reflexion on the Polanyi sphere, because scattering is point symmetric with respect to the origin of s-space. Mapped onto the detector are only those points of the reflexion in s-space that are both on the Ewald sphere and on the Polanyi sphere. These points form the reflexion circle (blue ring). It does not change as the fiber is tilted. As with a slide projector the reflexion circle is projected (red moving rays) on the detector (detector circle, blue ring). There up to 4 images (red spots) of the monitored reflexion can show up. The position of the reflexion images is a function of the orientation of the fiber in the primary beam (Polanyi equation). From the Polanyi representation of fiber diffraction geometry the relations of the fiber mapping are established by elementary and spherical geometry.

Pattern correction

The figure on the left shows a typical fiber pattern of polypropylene before mapping it into reciprocal space. The mirror axis in the pattern is rotated by the angle  with respect to the vertical direction. This shortcoming is compensated by simple rotation of the picture. 4 straight arrows point at 4 reflexion images of a chosen reference reflexion. Their positions are used to determine the fiber tilt angle . The image has been recorded on a CCD detector. It shows the logarithmic intensitity in pseudo-color representation. Here bright colors represent high intensity.

After determination of  the distance between sample and detector is computed using known crystallographic data of the reference reflexion, a uniformly gridded map for the representative fiber plane in reciprocal space is constructed and the diffraction data are fed into this map. The figure on the right shows the result. Change of scattering intensity has been considered in the unwarping process. Because of the curvature of the surface of the Ewald sphere there remain white spots at the meridian, in which structure information is missing. Only in the center of the image and at an s-value related to the scattering angle  there is structure information on the meridian. Of course, there is now 4-quadrant symmetry. This means that in the example pattern part of the missing information may be copied "from the lower half to the upper half" into the white areas. Thus, it frequently makes sense to tilt the fiber intentionally.

The three-dimensional sketch demonstrates that in the example experiment the collected information on the molecular structure of the polypropylene fiber is almost complete. By rotation of the plane pattern about the meridian the scattering data collected in 4 s fill an almost spherical volume of s-space. In the example the 4-quadrant symmetry has not yet been considered to fill part of the white spots. For clarity a quarter of the sphere has been cut out, but keeping the equatorial plane itself.

References

Arnott S & Wonacott A J, The Refinement of the Molecular & Crystal Structures of Polymers Using X-Ray Data and Stereochemical Constraints, Polymer 1966 7 157 - 166
Bian W, Wang H, McCullogh I, Stubbs G (2006). "WCEN: a computer program for initial processing of fiber diffraction patterns". J. Appl. Crystallogr., 39, 752-756.
Bunn C W, Chemical Crystallography, University of Oxford, 2nd Ed, 1967
Campbell Smith P J & Arnott S, LALS (etc.) Acta Crystallogr 1978 A34 3 - 11
Cochran W, Crick FHC, and Vand V (1952). "The Structure of Synthetic Polypeptides. I. The Transform of Atoms on a Helix". Acta Crystallogr., 5, 581-586.
Donohue J, and Trueblood, K N, On the unreliability of the reliability index, Acta Crystallogr, 1956, 9, 615
Franklin RE, Gosling RG (1953) "The Structure of Sodium Thymonucleate Fibres. II. The Cylindrically Symmetrical Patterson Function". Acta Crystallogr., 6, 678-685
Fraser RDB, Macrae TP, Miller A, Rowlands RJ (1976). "Digital Processing of Fibre Diffraction Patterns". J. Appl. Crystallogr., 9, 81-94.
Hamilton W C, R-Factors, Statistics and Truth, Paper H5, Amer Cryst Ass Program & Abstracts, Boulder, Colorado, 1961
Hamilton W C, Significance Tests on the Crystallographic R Factor, Acta Crystallogr 1965 18 502 - 510
James T W & Mazia D, Surface Films of Desoxyribonucleic Acid, Biochim Biophys Acta 1953 10 367 - 370
Marvin DA (2017) "Fibre diffraction studies of biological macromolecules". Prog. Biophys. Mol. Biol. 127, 43-87.
Millane RP, Arnott S (1985) "Digital Processing of X-Ray Diffraction Patterns from Oriented Fibers". J. Macromol. Sci. Phys., B24, 193-227
Polanyi M (1921) "Das Röntgen-Faserdiagramm (Erste Mitteilung)". Z. Physik, 7, 149-180
Polanyi M, Weissenberg K (1923) "Das Röntgen-Faserdiagramm (Zweite Mitteilung)". Z. Physik, 9, 123-130
Rajkumar G, AL-Khayat H, Eakins F, He A, Knupp C, Squire J (2005) "FibreFix — A New Integrated CCP13 Software Package", Fibre Diffraction Rev., 13, 11-18
Stribeck N (2009). "On the determination of fiber tilt angles in fiber diffraction" Acta Crystallogr., A65, 46-47

Text books
Alexander LE (1979) "X-Ray Diffraction Methods in Polymer Science", Wiley, New York
Klug HP, Alexander LE (1974) "X-Ray Diffraction Procedures For Polycrystalline and Amorphous Materials", 2nd ed, Wiley, New York
Warren BE (1990) "X-Ray Diffraction". Dover, New York
Saad Mohamed (1994) "Low resolution structure and packing investigations of collagen crystalline domains in tendon using Synchrotron Radiation X-rays, Structure factors determination, evaluation of Isomorphous Replacement methods and other modeling." PhD Thesis, Université Joseph Fourier Grenoble 1

External links
WCEN — Software (Linux, Mac, Windows) for the analysis of fiber patterns
Fiber Diffraction — an introduction provided by Prof. K.C. Holmes, Max Planck Institute for Medical Research, Heidelberg.

Protein structure